Nadeem Cheema is a Pakistani film director and actor. He is best known for action film Geo Sar Utha Kay. He founded the film production company Nadeem Cheema Films.

Career 
His first film was Geo Sar Utha Kay (2017). Nadeem Cheema has also worked on the project of film 36 Garh, released in 2021.

Films

References

External links 
 
 Nadeem Cheema  on Youtube
 Nadeem Cheema  on Mubi
Nadeem Cheema on Facebook

1986 births
Living people
Pakistani film directors
Pakistani film actors
Action film directors
Pakistani film producers
Film directors from Lahore